Aleksandr Vladimirovich Pal (born 16 December 1988) is a Russian actor. He appeared in more than fifteen films since 2013.

Biography 
Pal is a descendant of Russian Germans caught up in the Urals as a result of repression. Initially, he did not plan to become an actor. He studied at the GITIS on the course of Leonid Kheifets. He acted in the plays of the Moscow Youth Theater and the Mayakovsky Theater.

Filmography

Awards
 Sakhalin International Film Festival  — Best Actor Award (Rag Union)
 Kinotavr — Best Actor Award (Rag Union)

References

External links 

Aleksander Pal on Instagram

1988 births
Living people
People from Chelyabinsk
Russian male film actors
Russian male stage actors
Russian male television actors
Russian people of German descent